Dibromotyrosine is an antithyroid preparation and a derivative of the natural amino acid tyrosine.

It is formed by eosinophil peroxidase.

References

Amino acid derivatives
Bromoarenes